Khingila I (Bactrian:  χιγγιλο Khingilo, Brahmi script: Khi-ṇgi-la, Middle Chinese: 金吉剌 Jīnjílà, Persian: شنگل Shengel; c.430-490) was the founding king of the Hunnic Alkhan dynasty (Bactrian: αλχανο, Middle Chinese: 嚈噠). He was a contemporary of Khushnavaz (fl. 484).

Rule
In response to the migration of the Wusun (who were hard-pressed by the Rouran) from Zhetysu to the Pamir region, Khingila united the Uars and the Xionites in 460AD, establishing the Hepthalite dynasty.

According to the Syrian compilation of Church Historian Zacharias Rhetor (c. 465, Gaza – after 536), bishop of Mytilene, the need for new grazing land to replace that lost to the Wusun led Khingila's "Uar-Chionites" to displace the Sabirs to the west, who in turn displaced the Saragur, Ugor and Onogur, who then asked for an alliance and land from Byzantium.

In his coin in the Brahmi script, Khingila uses the legend "God-King Khingila" (Deva Shahi Khingila). 

A "Seal of Khingila" is known, with legend in the Bactrian language, but it is uncertain if it belonged to Khingila, or another ruler of the same name.

Khingila is also known from a Brahmi inscription, the Talagan copper scroll.

Artifacts

See also
Kidarites

References

External links
 Khingila coinage
 Online catalogue of Khingila coins

Central Asia
Hephthalites
430 births
490 deaths